Verkhnia Krasnianka is a village in the Luhansk Raion (district) of Luhansk Oblast (province) of eastern Ukraine. It is located on the right bank of the Bolshaya Kamenka River. Population: 638 (2001 Census).

Verkhnyaya Krasnyanka was founded in the 18th century.

Villages in Luhansk Raion